The Tampa Bay Rays 2014 season was the Rays' 17th season of Major League Baseball and the seventh as the "Rays" (all at Tropicana Field). The team finished at 77-85, their first losing season as the Rays.

Season standings

American League East

Record vs. opponents

Regular season summary
The Rays 2014 season started out harsh entering May. Tampa Bay went 11–16 since opening day and was struggling to move up in the American League East early on. In addition to their rough first month of baseball, May did not do any favors. In May the Rays posted a 12–17 record. To make things worse, 2014 was being played without Matt Moore in their rotation and numerous other injuries (along with Moore's) may have begun to take a toll on the Rays' recent tendencies to make playoff runs.

In June the Rays went 13–16 and followed that with an amazing July where they won 17 games and lost only 6. During the All Star Break, David Price was recognized as the only Tampa Bay representative. Price, Zobrist, and a few other Rays were in the midst of trade rumors. Price was dealt to the Detroit Tigers at the trade deadline in a three-way deal with Seattle. The Rays acquired Nick Franklin from Seattle and Drew Smyly from Detroit. Some analysts felt the Rays deserved more for David Price. After all, they gave the Tigers the 2012 American League Cy Young Award Winner to their rotation. (Detroit now had the previous three Cy Young Award winners in the American League in their rotation)

Season log

Regular season

|- align="center" bgcolor="ccffcc"
| 1 || March 31 || Blue Jays || 9–2 || Price (1–0) || Dickey (0–1) || — || 31,042 || 1–0 || 
|- align="center" bgcolor="ffcccc"
| 2 || April 1 || Blue Jays || 2–4 || Hutchison (1–0) || Cobb (0–1) || Santos (1) || 11,113 || 1–1 || 
|- align="center" bgcolor="ffcccc"
| 3 || April 2 || Blue Jays || 0–3 || Buehrle (1–0) || Moore (0–1) || Cecil (1) || 10,808 || 1–2 || 
|- align="center" bgcolor="ccffcc"
| 4 || April 3 || Blue Jays || 7–2 || Archer (1–0) || Morrow (0–1) || — || 9,571 || 2–2 || 
|- align="center" bgcolor="ccffcc"
| 5 || April 4 || Rangers || 8–1 || Odorizzi (1–0) || Saunders (0–1) || — || 14,304 || 3–2 || 
|- align="center" bgcolor="ccffcc"
| 6 || April 5 || Rangers || 5–4 || Gomes (1–0) || Cotts (0–1) || Balfour (1) || 30,364 || 4–2 || 
|- align="center" bgcolor="ffcccc"
| 7 || April 6 || Rangers || 0–3 || Darvish (1–0) || Peralta (0–1) || Soria (1) || 22,569 || 4–3 || 
|- align="center" bgcolor="ffcccc"
| 8 || April 7 || @ Royals || 2–4 || Vargas (1–0) || Moore (0–2) || Holland (3) || 12,087 || 4–4 || 
|- align="center" bgcolor="ccffcc"
| 9 || April 8 || @ Royals || 1–0 || Peralta (1–1) || Holland (0–1) || Balfour (2) || 13,905 || 5–4 || 
|- align="center" bgcolor="ffcccc"
| 10 || April 9 || @ Royals || 3–7 || Guthrie (2–0) || Odorizzi (1–1) || — || 13,612 || 5–5 || 
|- align="center" bgcolor="ccffcc"
| 11 || April 11 || @ Reds || 2–1 || Price (2–0) || Cueto (0–2) || Balfour (3) || 30,502 || 6–5 || 
|- align="center" bgcolor="ccffcc"
| 12 || April 12 || @ Reds || 1–0 || Cobb (1–1) || Simón (1–1) || Balfour (4) || 35,356 || 7–5 || 
|- align="center" bgcolor="ffcccc"
| 13 || April 13 || @ Reds || 4–12 || Cingrani (1–1) || Ramos (0–1) || — || 34,307 || 7–6 || 
|- align="center" bgcolor="ffcccc"
| 14 || April 14 || @ Orioles || 1–7 || Chen (2–1) || Archer (1–1) || — || 15,799 || 7–7 || 
|- align="center" bgcolor="bbbbbb"
| — || April 15 || @ Orioles || colspan=7|Postponed (rain); Makeup: June 27
|- align="center" bgcolor="ffcccc"
| 15 || April 16 || @ Orioles || 0–3 || González (1–1) || Odorizzi (1–2) ||Hunter (4) || 22,611 || 7–8 || 
|- align="center" bgcolor="ffcccc"
| 16 || April 17 || Yankees || 2–10 || Sabathia (2–2) || Price (2–1) || — || 28,085 || 7–9 || 
|- align="center" bgcolor="ccffcc"
| 17 || April 18 || Yankees || 11–5 || McGee (1–0) || Warren (0–1) || — || 26,079 || 8–9 || 
|- align="center" bgcolor="ccffcc"
| 18 || April 19 || Yankees || 16–1 || Archer (2–1) || Nova (2–2) || — || 30,159 || 9–9 || 
|- align="center" bgcolor="ffcccc"
| 19 || April 20 || Yankees || 1–5 (12) || Claiborne (1–0) || Bell (0–1) || — || 26,462 || 9–10 || 
|- align="center" bgcolor="ccffcc"
| 20 || April 22 || Twins || 7–3 || Price (3–1) || Gibson (3–1) || — || 11,785 || 10–10 || 
|- align="center" bgcolor="ffcccc"
| 21 || April 23 || Twins || 4–6 (12) || Fien (3–0) || Lueke (0–1) || Perkins (4) || 11,993 || 10–11 || 
|- align="center" bgcolor="ffcccc"
| 22 || April 24 || Twins || 7–9 || Nolasco (2–2) || Bédard (0–1) || Perkins (5) || 13,177 || 10–12 || 
|- align="center" bgcolor="ffcccc"
| 23 || April 25 || @ White Sox || 6–9 || Lindstrom (2–1) || Balfour (0–1) || — || 17,210 || 10–13 || 
|- align="center" bgcolor="ccffcc"
| 24 || April 26 || @ White Sox || 4–0 || Ramos (1–1) || Danks (2–1) || — || 22,412 || 11–13 || 
|- align="center" bgcolor="ffcccc"
| 25 || April 27 || @ White Sox || 2–9 || Carroll (1–0) || Price (3–2) || — || 17,313 || 11–14 || 
|- align="center" bgcolor="ffcccc"
| 26 || April 28 || @ White Sox || 3–7 || Rienzo (2–0) || Odorizzi (1–3) || — || 11,268 || 11–15 || 
|- align="center" bgcolor="ffcccc"
| 27 || April 29 || @ Red Sox || 4–7 || Lackey (4–2) || Gomes (1–1) || Uehara (6) || 34,794 || 11–16 || 
|- align="center" bgcolor="bbbbbb"
| — || April 30 || @ Red Sox || colspan=7|Postponed (rain); Makeup: May 1
|-

|- align="center" bgcolor="ccffcc"
| 28 || May 1  || @ Red Sox || 2–1 || Gomes (2–1) || Peavy (1–1) || Balfour (5) || 35,621 || 12–16 || 
|- align="center" bgcolor="ccffcc"
| 29 || May 1  || @ Red Sox || 6–5 || McGee (2–0) || Uehara (0–1) || Balfour (6) || 33,465 || 13–16 || 
|- align="center" bgcolor="ccffcc"
| 30 || May 2 || @ Yankees || 10–5 (14) || Bell (1–1) || Leroux (0–1) || — || 33,580 || 14–16 || 
|- align="center" bgcolor="ffcccc"
| 31 || May 3 || @ Yankees || 3–9 || Tanaka (4–0) || Lueke (0–2) || — || 43,325 || 14–17 || 
|- align="center" bgcolor="ccffcc"
| 32 || May 4 || @ Yankees || 5–1 || Bédard (1–1) || Sabathia (3–4) || — || 41,122 || 15–17 || 
|- align="center" bgcolor="ffcccc"
| 33 || May 6 || Orioles || 3–5 || O'Day (1–0) || Peralta (1–2) || Hunter (9) || 11,855 || 15–18 || 
|- align="center" bgcolor="ffcccc"
| 34 || May 7 || Orioles || 3–4 || Webb (1–0) || Gomes (2–2) || Hunter (10) || 11,282 || 15–19 || 
|- align="center" bgcolor="ffcccc"
| 35 || May 8 || Orioles || 1–3 || Jiménez (2–4) || Price (3–3) || O'Day (2–0) || 11,076 || 15–20 || 
|- align="center" bgcolor="ffcccc"
| 36 || May 9 || Indians || 3–6 || Kluber (3–3) || Peralta (1–3) || Allen (1) || 17,541 || 15–21 || 
|- align="center" bgcolor="ccffcc"
| 37 || May 10 || Indians || 7–1 || Bédard (2–1) || McAllister (3–3) || — || 29,212 || 16–21 || 
|- align="center" bgcolor="ffcccc"
| 38 || May 11 || Indians || 5–6 || Tomlin (2–0) || Archer (2–2) || Shaw (2) || 23,679 || 16–22 || 
|- align="center" bgcolor="ffcccc"
| 39 || May 12 || @ Mariners || 5–12 || Hernández (4–1) || Ramos (1–2) || — || 12,392 || 16–23 || 
|- align="center" bgcolor="ccffcc"
| 40 || May 13 || @ Mariners || 2–1 || Price (4–3) || Rodney (1–2) || — || 13,446 || 17–23 || 
|-align="center" bgcolor="ccffcc"
| 41 || May 14 || @ Mariners || 2–0 || Odorizzi (2–3) || Maurer (1–2) || Balfour (7) || 20,951 || 18–23 || 
|- align="center" bgcolor="ffcccc"
| 42 || May 15 || @ Angels || 5–6 || Salas (3–0) || Boxberger (0–1) || — || 34,441 || 18–24 || 
|- align="center" bgcolor="ccffcc"
| 43 || May 16 || @ Angels || 3–0 || Archer (3–2) || Weaver (4–3) || Balfour (8) || 38,796 || 19–24 || 
|- align="center" bgcolor="ffcccc"
| 44 || May 17 || @ Angels || 0–6 || Wilson (5–3) || Ramos (1–3) || — || 42,224 || 19–25 || 
|- align="center" bgcolor="ffcccc"
| 45 || May 18 || @ Angels || 2–6 || Shoemaker (2–1) || Price (4–4) || — || 36,655 || 19–26 || 
|- align="center" bgcolor="ffcccc"
| 46 || May 20 || Athletics || 0–3 || Pomeranz (4–1) || Odorizzi (2–4) || Doolittle (3) || 11,369 || 19–27 || 
|- align="center" bgcolor="ffcccc"
| 47 || May 21 || Athletics || 2–3 || Milone (2–3) || Bédard (2–2) || Doolittle (4) || 10,555 || 19–28 || 
|- align="center" bgcolor="ccffcc"
| 48 || May 22 || Athletics || 5–2 (11) || Lueke (1–2) || Otero (4–1) || — || 11,257 || 20–28 || 
|- align="center" bgcolor="ccffcc"
| 49 || May 23 || Red Sox || 1–0 || Oviedo (1–0) || Miller (1–3) || — || 20,898 || 21–28 || 
|- align="center" bgcolor="ccffcc"
| 50 || May 24 || Red Sox || 6–5 (15) || Ramos (2–3) || Miller (1–4) || — || 23,569 || 22–28 || 
|- align="center" bgcolor="ccffcc"
| 51 || May 25 || Red Sox || 8–5 || Peralta (2–3) || Breslow (2–1) || Balfour (9) || 26,199 || 23–28 || 
|- align="center" bgcolor="ffcccc"
| 52 || May 26 || @ Blue Jays || 5–10 || Hutchison (4–3) || Bédard (2–3) || — || 15,616 || 23–29 || 
|- align="center" bgcolor="ffcccc"
| 53 || May 27 || @ Blue Jays || 6–9 || Buehrle (9–1) || Cobb (1–2) || Janssen (8) || 15,993 || 23–30 || 
|- align="center" bgcolor="ffcccc"
| 54 || May 28 || @ Blue Jays || 2–3 || Loup (2–1) || Oviedo (1–1) || — || 17,309 || 23–31 || 
|- align="center" bgcolor="ffcccc"
| 55 || May 30 || @ Red Sox || 2–3 (10) || Miller (2–4) || Oviedo (1–2) || — || 35,820 || 23–32 || 
|- align="center" bgcolor="ffcccc"
| 56 || May 31 || @ Red Sox || 1–7 || De La Rosa (1–0) || Odorizzi (2–5) || — || 37,076 || 23–33 || 
|-

|- align="center" bgcolor="ffcccc"
| 57 || June 1 || @ Red Sox || 0–4 || Lester (6–6) || Bédard (2–4) || — || 37,688 || 23–34 || 
|- align="center" bgcolor="ffcccc"
| 58 || June 2 || @ Marlins || 1–3 || Wolf (1–1) || Cobb (1–3) || Cishek (12) || 18,155 || 23–35 || 
|- align="center" bgcolor="ffcccc"
| 59 || June 3 || @ Marlins || 0–1 || Álvarez (3–3) || Archer (3–3) || — || 21,303 || 23–36 || 
|- align="center" bgcolor="ffcccc"
| 60 || June 4 || Marlins || 4–5 || Koehler (5–5) || Price (4–5) || Cishek (13) || 10,897 || 23–37 || 
|- align="center" bgcolor="ffcccc"
| 61 || June 5 || Marlins || 6–11 || Turner (2–3) || Odorizzi (2–6) || — || 10,442 || 23–38 || 
|- align="center" bgcolor="ccffcc"
| 62 || June 6 || Mariners || 4–0 || Bédard (3–4) || Young (5–3) || — || 14,577 || 24–38 || 
|- align="center" bgcolor="ffcccc"
| 63 || June 7 || Mariners || 4–7 || Elías (5–4) || Cobb (1–4) || Rodney (17) || 23,996 || 24–39 || 
|- align="center" bgcolor="ffcccc"
| 64 || June 8 || Mariners || 0–5 || Medina (3–1) || Bafour (0–2) || — || 18,158 || 24–40 || 
|- align="center" bgcolor="ffcccc"
| 65 || June 9 || Mariners || 0–3 || Beimel (1–1) || Price (4–6) || Rodney (18) || 10,400 || 24–41 || 
|- align="center" bgcolor="ffcccc"
| 66 || June 10 || Cardinals || 0–1 || Wainwright (9–3) || Odorizzi (2–7) || Rosenthal (17) || 17,226 || 24–42 || 
|- align="center" bgcolor="ccffcc"
| 67 || June 11 || Cardinals || 6–3 || Oviedo (2–2) || Wacha (4–5) || Bafour (10) || 15,930 || 25–42 || 
|- align="center" bgcolor="ccffcc"
| 68 || June 13 || @ Astros || 6–1 || Cobb (2–4) || McHugh (4–4) || — ||  26,829 || 26–42 || 
|- align="center" bgcolor="ffcccc"
| 69 || June 14 || @ Astros || 3–7 || Cosart (6–5) || Archer (3–4) || — || 26,264 || 26–43 || 
|- align="center" bgcolor="ccffcc"
| 70 || June 15 || @ Astros || 4–3 || Price (5–6) || Williams (1–3) || McGee (1) || 25,526 || 27–43 || 
|- align="center" bgcolor="ccffcc"
| 71 || June 16 || Orioles || 5–4 || McGee (3–0) || O'Day (2–1) || Oviedo (1) || 10,576 || 28–43 || 
|- align="center" bgcolor="ffcccc"
| 72 || June 17 || Orioles || 5–7 || González (4–4) || Bédard (3–5) || Britton (8) || 10,803 || 28–44 || 
|- align="center" bgcolor="ffcccc"
| 73 || June 18 || Orioles || 0–2 || Gausman (3–1) || Cobb (2–5) || Britton (9) || 12,448 || 28–45 || 
|- align="center" bgcolor="ccffcc"
| 74 || June 19 || Astros || 5–0 || Archer (4–4) || McHugh (4–5) || — || 10,880 || 29–45 || 
|- align="center" bgcolor="ffcccc"
| 75 || June 20 || Astros || 1–3 || Cosart (7–5) || Price (5–7) || Qualls (9) || 13,861 || 29–46 || 
|- align="center" bgcolor="ccffcc"
| 76 || June 21 || Astros || 8–0 || Odorizzi (3–7) || Buchanan (0–1) || — || 17,551 || 30–46 || 
|- align="center" bgcolor="ccffcc"
| 77 || June 22 || Astros || 5–2 || Oviedo (3–2) || Keuchel (8–5) || Peralta (1) || 18,841 || 31–46 || 
|- align="center" bgcolor="ffcccc"
| 78 || June 23 || Pirates || 1–8 || Vólquez (5–6) || Cobb (2–6) || — || 13,175 || 31–47 || 
|- align="center" bgcolor="ffcccc"
| 79 || June 24 || Pirates || 5–6 || Locke (1–1) || Archer (4–5) || Melancon (13) || 14,684 || 31–48 || 
|- align="center" bgcolor="ccffcc"
| 80 || June 25 || Pirates || 5–1 || Price (6–7) || Morton (4–9) || — || 23,761 || 32–48 || 
|- align="center" bgcolor="ccffcc"
| 81 || June 27  || @ Orioles || 5–2 || Colomé (1–0) || Gausman (3–2) || McGee (2) || 15,614 || 33–48 || 
|- align="center" bgcolor="ffcccc"
| 82 || June 27  || @ Orioles || 1–4 || Tillman (7–4) || Oviedo (3–3) || Britton (10) || 34,895 || 33–49 || 
|- align="center" bgcolor="ccffcc"
| 83 || June 28 || @ Orioles || 5–4 || Bédard (4–5) || Chen (7–3) || McGee (3) || 36,387 || 34–49 || 
|- align="center" bgcolor="ccffcc"
| 84 || June 29 || @ Orioles || 12–7 || Cobb (3–6) || Meek (0–3) || — || 32,665 || 35–49 || 
|- align="center" bgcolor="ccffcc"
| 85 || June 30 || @ Yankees || 4–3 (12) || Boxberger (1–1) || Ramírez (0–2) || — || 36,052 || 36–49 || 
|-

|- align="center" bgcolor="ccffcc"
| 86 || July 1 || @ Yankees || 2–1 || Price (7–7) || Kuroda (5–6) || Bafour (11) || 35,866 || 37–49 || 
|- align="center" bgcolor="ccffcc"
| 87 || July 2 || @ Yankees || 6–3 || Odorizzi (4–7) || Nuño (2–5) || Boxberger (1) || 42,343 || 38–49 || 
|- align="center" bgcolor="ffcccc"
| 88 || July 3 || @ Tigers || 1–8 || Scherzer (10–3) || Bédard (4–6) || — || 33,908 || 38–50 || 
|- align="center" bgcolor="ccffcc"
| 89 || July 4 || @ Tigers || 6–3 || Cobb (4–6) || Smyly (4–8) || McGee (4) || 40,657 || 39–50 || 
|- align="center" bgcolor="ccffcc"
| 90 || July 5 || @ Tigers || 7–2 || Archer (5–5) || Sánchez (5–3) || — || 38,087 || 40–50 || 
|- align="center" bgcolor="ccffcc"
| 91 || July 6 || @ Tigers || 7–3 || Price (8–7) || Porcello (11–5) || McGee (5) || 31,917 || 41–50 || 
|- align="center" bgcolor="ffcccc"
| 92 || July 7 || Royals || 0–6 || Shields (9–4) || Odorizzi (4–8) || — || 13,406 || 41–51 || 
|- align="center" bgcolor="ccffcc"
| 93 || July 8 || Royals || 4–3 || Boxberger (2–1) || Vargas (8–4) || McGee (6) || 12,818 || 42–51 || 
|- align="center" bgcolor="ffcccc"
| 94 || July 9 || Royals || 4–5 || Crow (4–1) || Yates (0–1) || Holland (24) || 12,150 || 42–52 || 
|- align="center" bgcolor="ffcccc"
| 95 || July 11 || Blue Jays || 5–8 || Loup (3–2) || Balfour (0–3) || Janssen (14) || 17,533 || 42–53 || 
|- align="center" bgcolor="ccffcc"
| 96 || July 12 || Blue Jays || 10–3 || Odorizzi (5–8) || Hutchison (6–8) || — || 22,693 || 43–53 || 
|- align="center" bgcolor="ccffcc"
| 97 || July 13 || Blue Jays || 3–0 || Price (9–7) || Dickey (7–9) || McGee (7) || 17,187 || 44–53 || 
|- align="center"
|colspan="10" bgcolor="#bbcaff"|All-Star Break
|- align="center" bgcolor="ccffcc"
| 98 || July 18 || @ Twins || 6–2 || Cobb (4–6) || Gibson (8–8) || — || 31,058 || 45–53 || 
|- align="center" bgcolor="ccffcc"
| 99 || July 19 || @ Twins || 5–1 || Price (10–7) || Hughes (10–6) || McGee (8) || 36,117 || 46–53 || 
|- align="center" bgcolor="ccffcc"
| 100 || July 20 || @ Twins || 5–3 || Archer (6–5) || Correia (5–12) || Yates (1) || 26,821 || 47–53 || 
|- align="center" bgcolor="ccffcc"
| 101 || July 22 || @ Cardinals || 7–2 || Odorizzi (6–8) || Wainwright (12–5) || — || 43,623 || 48–53 || 
|- align="center" bgcolor="ccffcc"
| 102 || July 23 || @ Cardinals || 3–0 || Cobb (6–6) || Lynn (11–7) || McGee (9) || 43,564 || 49–53 || 
|- align="center" bgcolor="ccffcc"
| 103 || July 25 || Red Sox || 6–4 || Price (11–7) || Tazawa (1–2) || McGee (10) || 23,136 || 50–53 || 
|- align="center" bgcolor="ccffcc"
| 104 || July 26 || Red Sox || 3–0 || Balfour (1–3) || Lackey (11–7) || McGee (11) || 26,659 || 51–53 || 
|- align="center" bgcolor="ffcccc"
| 105 || July 27 || Red Sox || 2–3 || Webster (1–0) || Archer (6–6) || Uehara (21) || 25,221 || 51–54 || 
|- align="center" bgcolor="ccffcc"
| 106 || July 28 || Brewers || 2–1 || Odorizzi (6–8) || Lohse (11–5) || McGee (12) || 12,660 || 52–54 || 
|- align="center" bgcolor="ccffcc"
| 107 || July 29 || Brewers || 5–1 || Cobb (6–6) || Smith (1–2) || — || 16,249 || 53–54 || 
|- align="center" bgcolor="ffcccc"
| 108 || July 30 ||Brewers || 0–5 || Gallardo (6–5) || Price (11–8) || Rodríguez (31) || 24,809 || 53–55 || 
|-

|- align="center" bgcolor="ffcccc"
| 109 || August 1 || Angels || 3–5 || Shoemaker (9–3) || Hellickson (0–1) || Street (29) || 20,969 || 53–56 || 
|- align="center" bgcolor="ccffcc"
| 110 || August 2 || Angels || 10–3 || Archer (7–6) || Wilson (8–7) || — || 23,656 || 54–56 || 
|- align="center" bgcolor="ffcccc"
| 111 || August 3 || Angels || 5–7 || Weaver (12–6) || Odorizzi (7–9) || Street (30) || 25,877 || 54–57 || 
|- align="center" bgcolor="ffcccc"
| 112 || August 4 || @ Athletics || 2–3 (10) || Cook (1–1) || Balfour (1–4) || — || 18,479 || 54–58 || 
|- align="center" bgcolor="ffcccc"
| 113 || August 5 || @ Athletics || 0–3 || Hammel (9–9) || Smyly (6–10) || Doolittle (17) || 16,335 || 54–59 || 
|- align="center" bgcolor="ccffcc"
| 114 || August 6 || @ Athletics || 7–3 || Hellickson (1–1) || Gray (12–5) || — || 25,513 || 55–59 || 
|- align="center" bgcolor="ccffcc"
| 115 || August 8 || @ Cubs || 5–4 (10) || Boxberger (3–1) || Rondon (3–4) || — || 34,937 || 56–59 || 
|- align="center" bgcolor="ccffcc"
| 116 || August 9 || @ Cubs || 4–0 || Odorizzi (8–9) || Jackson (6–12) || — || 36,739 || 57–59 || 
|- align="center" bgcolor="ffcccc"
| 117 || August 10 || @ Cubs || 2–3 (12) || Villanueva (5–6) || Ramos (2–4) || — || 33,039 || 57–60 || 
|- align="center" bgcolor="ccffcc"
| 118 || August 11 || @ Rangers || 7–0 || Smyly (7–10) || Lewis (8–9) || — || 28,501 || 58–60 || 
|- align="center" bgcolor="ffcccc"
| 119 || August 12 || @ Rangers || 2–3 (14) || Baker (1–8) || Ramos (2–5) || — || 35,642 || 58–61 || 
|- align="center" bgcolor="ccffcc"
| 120 || August 13 || @ Rangers || 10–1 || Archer (8–6) || Mikolas (1–5) || — || 29,870 || 59–61 || 
|- align="center" bgcolor="ccffcc"
| 121 || August 14 || @ Rangers || 6–3 || Odorizzi (9–9) || Ross (2–5) || McGee (13) || 28,904 || 60–61 || 
|- align="center" bgcolor="ccffcc"
| 122 || August 15 || Yankees || 5–0 || Cobb (8–6) || McCarthy (7–12) || — || 26,535 || 61–61 || 
|- align="center" bgcolor="ffcccc"
| 123 || August 16 || Yankees || 2–3 || Betances (5–0) || McGee (3–1) || Robertson (32) || 31,042 || 61–62 || 
|- align="center" bgcolor="ffcccc"
| 124 || August 17 || Yankees || 2–4 || Kuroda (8–8) || Hellickson (1–2) || Robertson (33) || 28,812 || 61–63 || 
|- align="center" bgcolor="ffcccc"
| 125 || August 19 || Tigers || 6–8 (11) || Johnson (5–2) || Balfour (1–5) || Nathan (26) || 14,331 || 61–64 || 
|- align="center" bgcolor="ffcccc"
| 126 || August 20 || Tigers || 0–6 || Porcello (14–8) || Odorizzi (9–10) || — || 13,575 || 61–65 || 
|- align="center" bgcolor="ccffcc"
| 127 || August 21 || Tigers || 1–0 || Cobb (9–6) || Price (12–9) || McGee (14) || 19,189 || 62–65 || 
|- align="center" bgcolor="ccffcc"
| 128 || August 22 || @ Blue Jays || 8–0 || Smyly (8–10) || Stroman (7–5) || — || 28,506 || 63–65 || 
|- align="center" bgcolor="ffcccc"
| 129 || August 23 || @ Blue Jays || 4–5 (10) || McGowan (5–3) || Peralta (2–4) || — || 37,451 || 63–66 || 
|- align="center" bgcolor="ccffcc"
| 130 || August 24 || @ Blue Jays || 2–1 (10) || McGee (4–1) || Santos (0–3) || Boxberger (2) || 38,869 || 64–66 || 
|- align="center" bgcolor="ffcccc"
| 131 || August 25 || @ Orioles || 1–9 || Tillman (11–5) || Odorizzi (9–11) || — || 15,516 || 64–67 || 
|- align="center" bgcolor="ffcccc"
| 132 || August 26 || @ Orioles || 2–4 || Brach (5–0) || Balfour (1–6) || Britton (28) || 16,406 || 64–68 || 
|- align="center" bgcolor="ccffcc"
| 133 || August 27 || @ Orioles || 3–1 || Smyly (9–10) || Gausman (7–6) || McGee (15) || 20,762 || 65–68 || 
|- align="center" bgcolor="ffcccc"
| 134 || August 28 || @ Orioles || 4–5 || Miller (4–5) || Yates (0–2) || Britton (29) || 16,915 || 65–69 || 
|- align="center" bgcolor="ffcccc"
| 135 || August 29 || Red Sox || 3–8 || Ranaudo (3–0) || Archer (8–7) || — || 16,107 || 65–70 || 
|- align="center" bgcolor="ccffcc"
| 136 || August 30 || Red Sox || 7–0 || Odorizzi (10–11) || Webster (3–3) || — || 17,463 || 66–70 || 
|- align="center" bgcolor="ffcccc"
| 137 || August 31 || Red Sox || 0–3 || Buchholz (6–8) || Cobb (9–7) || — || 16,822 || 66–71 || 
|-

|- align="center" bgcolor="ccffcc"
| 138 || September 1 || Red Sox || 4–3 (10) || Balfour (2–6) || Badenhop (0–3) || — || 10,543 || 67–71 || 
|- align="center" bgcolor="ffcccc"
| 139 || September 2 || Blue Jays || 2–8 || Dickey (11–12) || Hellickson (1–3) || — || 10,125 || 67–72 || 
|- align="center" bgcolor="ffcccc"
| 140 || September 3 || Blue Jays || 4–7 || Stroman (9–5) || Archer (8–8) || Sanchez (2) || 10,264 || 67–73 || 
|- align="center" bgcolor="ffcccc"
| 141 || September 4 || Blue Jays || 0–1 (10) || Cecil (2–3) || Geltz (0–1) || Janssen (21) || 10,392 || 67–74 || 
|- align="center" bgcolor="ccffcc"
| 142 || September 5 || Orioles || 3–0 || Boxberger (4–1) || Webb (3–3) || McGee (16) || 14,632 || 68–74 || 
|- align="center" bgcolor="ccffcc"
| 143 || September 6 || Orioles || 3–2 || Boxberger (5–1) || Brach (5–1) || — || 17,969 || 69–74 || 
|- align="center" bgcolor="ffcccc"
| 144 || September 7 || Orioles || 5–7 (11) || Brach (6–1) || Ramos (2–6) || Miller (1) || 19,914 || 69–75 || 
|- align="center" bgcolor="ccffcc"
| 145 || September 9 || @ Yankees || 4–3 || Archer (9–8) || Kuroda (10–9) || McGee (17) || 31,188 || 70–75 || 
|- align="center" bgcolor="ffcccc"
| 146 || September 10 || @ Yankees || 5–8 || Claiborne (3–0) || Odorizzi (10–12) || — || 31,591 || 70–76 || 
|- align="center" bgcolor="ffcccc"
| 147 || September 11 || @ Yankees || 4–5 || Kelley (3–5) || McGee (4–2) || — || 32,627 || 70–77 || 
|- align="center" bgcolor="ccffcc"
| 148 || September 12 || @ Blue Jays || 1–0 || Karns (1–0) || Happ (9–10) || Balfour (12) || 19,909 || 71–77 || 
|- align="center" bgcolor="ffcccc"
| 149 || September 13 || @ Blue Jays || 3–6 || Dickey (13–12) || Boxberger (5–2) || Janssen (23) || 31,368 || 71–78 || 
|- align="center" bgcolor="ccffcc"
| 150 || September 14 || @ Blue Jays || 6–5 (10) || McGee (5–2) || Morrow (1–3) || Beliveau (1) || 28,633 || 72–78 || 
|- align="center" bgcolor="ccffcc"
| 151 || September 15 || Yankees || 1–0 || Peralta (3–4) || Kelley (3–6) || — || 16,058 || 73–78 || 
|- align="center" bgcolor="ccffcc"
| 152 || September 16 || Yankees || 6–1 || Odorizzi (11–12) || Pineda (3–5) || — || 21,387 || 74–78 || 
|- align="center" bgcolor="ffcccc"
| 153 || September 17 || Yankees || 2–3 || McCarthy (10–14) || Cobb (9–8) || Robertson (37) || 26,332 || 74–79 || 
|- align="center" bgcolor="ffcccc"
| 154 || September 19 || White Sox || 3–4 || Quintana (9–10) || Hellickson (1–4) || Putnam (6) || 17,540 || 74–80 || 
|- align="center" bgcolor="ccffcc"
| 155 || September 20 || White Sox || 3–1 || Archer (10–8) || Noesí (8–11) || McGee (18) || 21,830 || 75–80 || 
|- align="center" bgcolor="ffcccc"
| 156 || September 21 || White Sox || 5–10 || Danks (10–11) || Karns (1–1) || — || 21,270 || 75–81 || 
|- align="center" bgcolor="ccffcc"
| 157 || September 23 || @ Red Sox || 6–2 || Cobb (10–8) || Buchholz (8–10) || — || 35,566 || 76–81 || 
|- align="center" bgcolor="ffcccc"
| 158 || September 24 || @ Red Sox || 3–11 || Ranaudo (4–3) || Odorizzi (11–13) || — || 35,741 || 76–82 || 
|- align="center" bgcolor="ffcccc"
| 159 || September 25 || @ Red Sox || 1–11 || Webster (5–3) || Hellickson (1–5) || — || 36,590 || 76–83 || 
|- align="center" bgcolor="ffcccc"
| 160 || September 26 || @ Indians || 0–1 || Kluber (18–9) || Archer (10–9) || Allen (24) || 23,131 || 76–84 || 
|- align="center" bgcolor="ccffcc"
| 161 || September 27 || @ Indians || 2–0 || Colomé (2–0) || Carrasco (8–7) || McGee (19) || 33,025 || 77–84 || 
|- align="center" bgcolor="ffcccc"
| 162 || September 28 || @ Indians || 2–7 || House (5–3) || Cobb (10–9) || — || 21,400 || 77–85 || 
|-

Roster

Player stats
Note: All batting and pitching leaders in each category are in bold.

Batting
Note: G = Games played; AB = At bats; R = Runs scored; H = Hits; 2B = Doubles; 3B = Triples; HR = Home runs; RBI = Runs batted in; AVG = Batting average; SB = Stolen bases

Pitching
Note: W = Wins; L = Losses; ERA = Earned run average; G = Games pitched; GS = Games started; SV = Saves; IP = Innings pitched; H = Hits allowed; R = Runs allowed; ER = Earned runs allowed; BB = Walks allowed; K = Strikeouts

Farm system

References

External links

2014 Tampa Bay Rays season Official Site 
2014 Tampa Bay Rays season at ESPN
2014 Tampa Bay Rays season at Baseball Reference
2014 Tampa Bay Rays Attendance Review

Tampa Bay Rays season
Tampa Bay Rays
Tampa Bay Rays seasons